Amos Frishman (עמוס פרישמן; born September 20, 1964) is an Israeli former basketball player who played point guard for Israel and in the Israel Basketball Premier League, and is 1.84 metres tall.

Basketball career
Frishman played in the Israel Basketball Premier League from 1981-96. In 1991 he was the Israeli Premier League Assists Leader, with 5.4 per game.

He competed for the Israel men's national basketball team in the FIBA 1981 European Championship for Cadets: Final Round averaging 26.5 points per game, the FIBA 1982 European Championship for Junior Men averaging 14.1 points per game, and for the Israel men's national basketball team in the FIBA 1988 European Olympic Qualifying Tournament for Men averaging 9 points per game.

In 2017 Frishman was the Chairman of the Israel Basketball Association professional committee.

References 

Living people

1964 births
Israeli men's basketball players
Point guards
Israeli Basketball Premier League players